Frederick George Fisher Jr. (April 19, 1921 – May 25, 1989) was an American lawyer who first entered the public eye in connection with Senator Joseph McCarthy.

Life and career
Fisher was born in Brockton, Massachusetts, the son of Genevieve (Clark) and Frederick George Fisher. He graduated from Bowdoin College in 1942, summa cum laude. After serving in the Army Signal Corps during World War II, he attended Harvard Law School.  He graduated in 1948 and joined the law firm of Hale and Dorr in Boston.

In 1954, the firm represented the U.S. Army at the Army–McCarthy hearings on Senator Joseph McCarthy's conduct. Fisher and James D. St. Clair were the two attorneys initially sent to Washington, D.C. to assist Joseph Welch. On questioning them, Welch learned of Fisher's having belonged to the National Lawyers Guild while in law school and shortly after. Welch decided that that left-wing association made Fisher's participation in the hearings a potential problem, and a colleague, John Kimball, Jr., replaced Fisher on the case.

Fisher's name was prominently publicized when McCarthy intimated on national television that Welch should get Fisher fired as a Communist, and that Welch had specifically chosen him for the abortive assignment.  In response, Welch delivered the most memorable lines from the McCarthy Hearings:

Welch dismissed Fisher's association with the NLG as a youthful indiscretion and attacked McCarthy for naming the young man before a nationwide television audience without prior warning or previous agreement to do so:

When McCarthy tried to renew his attack, Welch interrupted him:

McCarthy tried to ask Welch another question about Fisher, and Welch cut him off:

The gallery erupted in applause.

These proceedings have been recorded in the documentary film Point of Order.

Fisher's work for the Lawyers Guild had been confirmed by Welch several weeks earlier in a New York Times article, which in turn led McCarthy to insinuate that Fisher was a Communist during the hearings.

Fisher went on to become a partner at Hale and Dorr. In 1973–74, he served as president of the Massachusetts Bar Association.

1989 Fisher died in Tel Aviv, Israel, where he was lecturing. In his New York Times obituary, Fisher was referred to as a "McCarthy target."

Legacy
In the 1977 made-for-television film Tail Gunner Joe, the scene was re-enacted with Burgess Meredith portraying Welch and Peter Boyle as McCarthy.

References

External links
 Transcript and mp3 of Welch–McCarthy exchange relating to Fred Fisher

1921 births
1989 deaths
McCarthyism
United States Army officers
Bowdoin College alumni
Harvard Law School alumni
United States Army personnel of World War II
People from Brockton, Massachusetts
Massachusetts lawyers
20th-century American lawyers
Wilmer Cutler Pickering Hale and Dorr people
Military personnel from Massachusetts